Campden Wonder is the name given to events surrounding the return of a man thought to have been murdered in the town of Chipping Campden, Gloucestershire, England, in the 17th century. A family servant and the servant's mother and brother were hanged for killing their master, but following the man's return it became clear that no murder had taken place, despite the testimony of one of the accused.

The story attracted popular attention in England in the years 1660–1662. The events were documented in a letter by Sir Thomas Overbury titled "A true and perfect account of the examination, confession, trial, condemnation and execution of Joan Perry, and her two sons, John and Richard Perry, for the supposed murder of Will. Harrison" and an accompanying letter by William Harrison detailing his whereabouts in the missing years.

Disappearance
On 16 August 1660, a 70-year-old man named William Harrison left his home in Chipping Campden, intending to walk two miles to the village of Charingworth. When he did not return home at the expected time, his wife sent his manservant John Perry to look for him. Neither Harrison nor Perry had returned by the next morning.

Edward Harrison, William Harrison's son, was then sent out to look for the pair and on his way to Charingworth he met John Perry. The servant said that he had not been able to find his master, and he and Edward continued to Ebrington, where they questioned one of the tenants whom Harrison had been going to see. The tenant said that Harrison had been there the previous night. Edward Harrison and John Perry then went to the village of Paxford, but their search proved fruitless.

Edward and John then headed back to Chipping Campden. During the journey they heard that some items belonging to William Harrison had been discovered on the main road between Chipping Campden and Ebrington. These included a hat, a shirt and a neckband. Although the hat had been slashed by a sharp implement, and the shirt and the neckband were covered in blood, there was no sign of the body of William Harrison.

Investigation
Under questioning John Perry said that he knew Harrison had been murdered, but claimed to be innocent of the crime. He then said that his mother, Joan, and his brother, Richard, had killed Harrison for his money and hidden the body. Joan and Richard denied that they had had anything to do with Harrison's disappearance, but John continued to say that they were guilty, claiming they had dumped his body in a millpond. The pond was dredged, but no body was found.

Trials
The first court hearings dealt with charges linked to a plot to steal money from William Harrison. Despite his mother and brother pleading not guilty, John Perry's testimony convinced the jury based on the following:
John seemed to have no apparent reason to be lying about the matter.
John claimed that he was the one who suggested the robbery to Richard.
John told the court that Joan and Richard had already stolen £140 from William Harrison's house the previous year.
John had lied about being attacked by robbers a few weeks before Harrison's disappearance.

The defendants had all changed their pleas to guilty, because as first time offenders they were granted a free pardon under the Indemnity and Oblivion Act of 1660. Writer Linda Stratmann states that this was a bad piece of advice by the lawyers for the defendants. However, at the time, the judge refused to prosecute the three for murder as there was no body.

In Spring 1661 the court reconvened to hear the charge of murder and, because of the earlier guilty plea to the robbery, they were now considered to be criminals. This time John Perry joined his mother and brother in pleading not guilty in the killing of William Harrison. The servant claimed that his original testimony had been false by reason of insanity. Nevertheless, the jury found all three of the Perrys guilty and they were sentenced to death.

The three Perrys were hanged together on Broadway Hill in Gloucestershire, and Broadway Tower now stands on the site of their hanging. On the scaffold Richard and John reiterated that they were entirely innocent of killing William Harrison. As their mother was also suspected of being a witch, she was executed first in case she had cast a spell on her sons which was preventing them from confessing.

Return of William Harrison
In 1662, Harrison returned to England aboard a ship from Lisbon. He claimed that he had been abducted, wounded, had his pockets stuffed with money and been spirited away on horses from England via Deal port in Kent, transferred to a Turkish ship and sold into slavery in the Ottoman Empire. Harrison said that after about a year and three quarters his master had died and that he then went to a port and stowed away on a Portuguese ship, finally returning to Dover by way of Lisbon.

The case led to the popular belief that England had a criminal law of 'no body, no murder'. Morton states that this is a misconception and that no such law existed.

Linda Stratmann, in her book Gloucestershire Murders, states that Harrison's story is questionable on several points: the abduction of a 70-year-old man, his pockets being stuffed with money and his selling into slavery for a few pounds; his being taken on horseback from Chipping Campden to Deal unnoticed; and his claims that his attackers wounded him in the thigh and side with a sword, then nursed him back to health.

Later accounts
John Masefield wrote two plays on the subject: The Campden Wonder and Mrs Harrison. The latter dealt with the popular myth that Harrison's wife committed suicide on learning that her husband was alive.

The case is mentioned, along with the Sandyford murder case, in E. C. Bentley's detective novel Trent's Last Case (1920). It is also mentioned (as the "Camden Mystery") in John Rhode's detective novel In Face of the Verdict (in the U.S., In the Face of the Verdict; 1936). Another novel by Victoria Bennett called The Poorest He (2005) gives a fictional account of the case.

There is also a radio play of the story dating from 1994, Roger Hume's The Campden Wonder.

The final track on Inkubus Sukkubus' 2016 album Barrow Wake is a musical telling of the tale.

See also
List of solved missing person cases

References

Bibliography

1660s in England
Chipping Campden
History of Gloucestershire
Missing person cases in England
Murder convictions without a body
Trials in England
Wrongful executions